Alexandra Hay (July 24, 1947 – October 11, 1993) was an American actress of the 1960s and 1970s best known for her roles in Guess Who's Coming to Dinner, Skidoo, and Model Shop.

Early life and modeling 

Born Alexandra Lynn Hay, she was a native of Los Angeles and attended Arroyo High School in El Monte, California.

In the early 1960s, Hay booked modeling jobs through her agent William Adrian. At 15, she was featured as the "American Beauty" for the May–June 1963 issue of DIG magazine. 

Her mother died on August 25, 1963, when Hay had recently turned 16. In 1964, she moved to Europe. In an interview, Hay described her time in Europe: "I modeled in London to earn a living, and I had a ball. That was in 1964 when London was exploding – all the excitement about the Beatles and The Beat – I nearly blew my mind."

Mainstream career 
On October 29, 1966, the Los Angeles Times reported "Columbia's New Talent Program has developed another young actress, Alexandra Hay, who has been signed to a long-term exclusive contract by the studio."

Hay's first credited role was in an episode of The Monkees entitled "Monkee Mother" (episode 27, original airdate March 20, 1967). Her career continued with small roles in the 1967 movies Guess Who's Coming to Dinner and The Ambushers. In the former, she portrayed a carhop who takes an ice cream order from Spencer Tracy’s character.

The Beard arrests 
Hay played the role of Jean Harlow in Michael McClure's controversial play The Beard. She was arrested on 14 nights for lewd conduct and later acquitted by the California Supreme Court on the basis that the First Amendment places strict limitations on the application of criminal laws to live theatrical performances.

Later career

Hay was chosen by the Hollywood Foreign Press Association to be Miss Golden Globe for the 1968 Golden Globe Awards ceremony, which was held at the Ambassador Hotel's Cocoanut Grove on February 12, 1968.

Hay's feature film credits include How Sweet It Is! (1968), Skidoo (1968), Model Shop (1969), The Greatest Mother of 'em All (1969), The Forests Are Nearly All Gone Now (1971; shelved), Fun and Games (1971) (released in the U.S. as 1000 Convicts and a Woman), The Love Machine (1971), How to Seduce a Woman (1974), How Come Nobody's on Our Side? (1974), That Girl from Boston (1975; shelved), Short Letter to the Long Goodbye (1978), and The One Man Jury (1978).

Hay had television roles in episodes of CBS Playhouse, Mission: Impossible, Love, American Style, Dan August, Thriller, Kojak, The Manhunter, The Streets of San Francisco, and Police Story. She also appeared in the television movies The F.B.I Story: The FBI Versus Alvin Karpis, Public Enemy Number One and The Screaming Woman. 

Hay was photographed by Mario Casilli for a February 1974 Playboy magazine pictorial entitled "Alexandra the Great."

Death

Hay died on October 11th, 1993 at age 46 of arteriosclerotic heart disease. She was cremated by The Alpha Society and her ashes were scattered at sea off Marina del Rey, California on October 19th, 1993.

Filmography

References

External links 
 
 Instagram tribute page
 Facebook tribute page
 Twitter tribute page
 YouTube tribute page
 Vimeo tribute page

1947 births
1993 deaths
20th-century American actresses
Actresses from Los Angeles
American film actresses
American television actresses
People from El Monte, California